The Soldiers Memorial Military Museum in downtown St. Louis, Missouri is a memorial and military museum, at 1315 Chestnut Street, owned by the City of St. Louis and operated by the Missouri Historical Society.  Interior east and west wings contain display cases with military displays and memorabilia from World War I and subsequent American wars. The open-air central breezeway contains a massive black marble cenotaph upon which are engraved the names of all of St. Louis' war dead from the first world war. 

The building was designed by St. Louis architectural firm Mauran, Russell & Crowell in a stripped Classical style, with a severely simplified form and limited ornament.  It was dedicated by Franklin Delano Roosevelt in 1936 and officially opened to the public on Memorial Day, 1938.

Four monumental sculptural groups representing figures of Loyalty, Vision, Courage and Sacrifice by sculptor Walker Hancock stand, with their horses, on the north and south sides of the building.  Other architectural sculpture here was completed by Hillis Arnold.

External links 
 Soldiers Memorial Military Museum, Missouri Historical Society
 Soldiers Memorial Commission, City of St. Louis
 St. Louis history site
 Oral history interview with Walker Hancock at Smithsonian Archives of American Art

Museums in St. Louis
Monuments and memorials in Missouri
Military and war museums in Missouri
1938 sculptures
Buildings and structures completed in 1938
Downtown West, St. Louis
1938 establishments in Missouri
Buildings and structures in St. Louis
Tourist attractions in St. Louis